Latitude Varsity is a small university located in Bellville, South Africa. It specializes in computer science, business education, and finance.

Ranking

External links
Official Site

Distance education institutions based in South Africa